Bupleurum is a large genus of annual or perennial herbs or woody shrubs, with about 190 species, belonging to the family Apiaceae. The full size of its species may vary between a few cm to up to 3 m high. Their compound umbels of small flowers are adorned with bracteoles that are sometimes large and may play a role in attracting pollinators. Rare among the Apiaceae are the simple leaves, bracts (if present), and bracteoles. The genus is almost exclusively native in the Old World Northern Hemisphere, with one species native to North America and one species native to southern Africa.

Species

Species accepted by the Plants of the World Online as of December 2022: 

Bupleurum acutifolium 
Bupleurum aeneum 
Bupleurum aequiradiatum 
Bupleurum affine 
Bupleurum aira 
Bupleurum aitchisonii 
Bupleurum alatum 
Bupleurum album 
Bupleurum aleppicum 
Bupleurum alpigenum 
Bupleurum americanum 
Bupleurum anatolicum 
Bupleurum andhricum 
Bupleurum angulosum 
Bupleurum angustissimum 
Bupleurum antonii 
Bupleurum apiculatum 
Bupleurum asperuloides 
Bupleurum atlanticum 
Bupleurum aureum 
Bupleurum badachschanicum 
Bupleurum baimaense 
Bupleurum balansae 
Bupleurum baldense 
Bupleurum barceloi 
Bupleurum benoistii 
Bupleurum bicaule 
Bupleurum boissieri 
Bupleurum boissieuanum 
Bupleurum bourgaei 
Bupleurum brachiatum 
Bupleurum brevicaule 
Bupleurum canaliculatum 
Bupleurum candollei 
Bupleurum canescens 
Bupleurum capillare 
Bupleurum cappadocicum 
Bupleurum chaishoui 
Bupleurum chevalieri 
Bupleurum chinense 
Bupleurum citrinum 
Bupleurum clarkeanum 
Bupleurum commelynoideum 
Bupleurum commutatum 
Bupleurum condensatum 
Bupleurum constancei 
Bupleurum contractum 
Bupleurum croceum 
Bupleurum dalhousianum 
Bupleurum davisii 
Bupleurum densiflorum 
Bupleurum dianthifolium 
Bupleurum dichotomum 
Bupleurum dielsianum 
Bupleurum distichophyllum 
Bupleurum dracaenoides 
Bupleurum dumosum 
Bupleurum eginense 
Bupleurum elatum 
Bupleurum erubescens 
Bupleurum euboeum 
Bupleurum euphorbioides 
Bupleurum exaltatum 
Bupleurum falcatum 
Bupleurum faurelii 
Bupleurum ferganense 
Bupleurum flavicans 
Bupleurum flavum 
Bupleurum flexile 
Bupleurum foliosum 
Bupleurum freitagii 
Bupleurum fruticescens 
Bupleurum fruticosum 
Bupleurum gansuense 
Bupleurum gaudianum 
Bupleurum gerardi 
Bupleurum ghahremanii 
Bupleurum gibraltaricum 
Bupleurum gilanicum 
Bupleurum gilesii 
Bupleurum glumaceum 
Bupleurum gracile 
Bupleurum gracilipes 
Bupleurum gracillimum 
Bupleurum greuteri 
Bupleurum gulczense 
Bupleurum gussonei 
Bupleurum hakgalense 
Bupleurum hamiltonii 
Bupleurum handiense 
Bupleurum haussknechtii 
Bupleurum heldreichii 
Bupleurum hoffmeisteri 
Bupleurum imaicola 
Bupleurum isphairamicum 
Bupleurum jucundum 
Bupleurum kabulicum 
Bupleurum kakiskalae 
Bupleurum kaoi 
Bupleurum karglii 
Bupleurum khasianum 
Bupleurum koechelii 
Bupleurum kohistanicum 
Bupleurum komarovianum 
Bupleurum kosopolianskyi 
Bupleurum krylovianum 
Bupleurum kunmingense 
Bupleurum kurdicum 
Bupleurum kurzii 
Bupleurum kweichowense 
Bupleurum lanceolatum 
Bupleurum lancifolium 
Bupleurum lateriflorum 
Bupleurum latissimum 
Bupleurum leucocladum 
Bupleurum libanoticum 
Bupleurum linczevskii 
Bupleurum lipskyanum 
Bupleurum longeradiatum 
Bupleurum longicaule 
Bupleurum longifolium 
Bupleurum lophocarpum 
Bupleurum luxiense 
Bupleurum lycaonicum 
Bupleurum maddenii 
Bupleurum malconense 
Bupleurum marginatum 
Bupleurum marschallianum 
Bupleurum martjanovii 
Bupleurum mayeri 
Bupleurum mesatlanticum 
Bupleurum microcephalum 
Bupleurum miyamorii 
Bupleurum mongolicum 
Bupleurum montanum 
Bupleurum multinerve 
Bupleurum mundii 
Bupleurum muschleri 
Bupleurum nanum 
Bupleurum nematocladum 
Bupleurum nigrescens 
Bupleurum nipponicum 
Bupleurum nodiflorum 
Bupleurum nordmannianum 
Bupleurum odontites 
Bupleurum oligactis 
Bupleurum orientale 
Bupleurum pachnospermum 
Bupleurum pamiricum 
Bupleurum papillosum 
Bupleurum pauciradiatum 
Bupleurum pendikum 
Bupleurum persicum 
Bupleurum petiolulatum 
Bupleurum petraeum 
Bupleurum plantagineum 
Bupleurum plantaginifolium 
Bupleurum polyactis 
Bupleurum polyclonum 
Bupleurum polyphyllum 
Bupleurum postii 
Bupleurum praealtum 
Bupleurum pulchellum 
Bupleurum qinghaiense 
Bupleurum ramosissimum 
Bupleurum ranunculoides 
Bupleurum regelii 
Bupleurum rigidum 
Bupleurum rischawianum 
Bupleurum rockii 
Bupleurum rollii 
Bupleurum rosulare 
Bupleurum rotundifolium 
Bupleurum rupestre 
Bupleurum sachalinense 
Bupleurum salicifolium 
Bupleurum schistosum 
Bupleurum scorzonerifolium 
Bupleurum semicompositum 
Bupleurum setaceum 
Bupleurum shanianum 
Bupleurum shikotanense 
Bupleurum sibiricum 
Bupleurum sikkimensis 
Bupleurum sintenisii 
Bupleurum × sitenskyi 
Bupleurum smithii 
Bupleurum sosnowskyi 
Bupleurum spinosum 
Bupleurum stellatum 
Bupleurum stenophyllum 
Bupleurum stewartianum 
Bupleurum subnivale 
Bupleurum subovatum 
Bupleurum subspinosum 
Bupleurum subuniflorum 
Bupleurum sulphureum 
Bupleurum swatianum 
Bupleurum tenuissimum 
Bupleurum terminum 
Bupleurum thianschanicum 
Bupleurum thomsonii 
Bupleurum trichopodum 
Bupleurum triradiatum 
Bupleurum turcicum 
Bupleurum tuschkanczik 
Bupleurum veronense 
Bupleurum virgatum 
Bupleurum wenchuanense 
Bupleurum wittmannii 
Bupleurum wolffianum 
Bupleurum woronowii 
Bupleurum yinchowense 
Bupleurum yunnanense 
Bupleurum zoharii

References

External links

 
Apioideae genera